Bdín is a municipality and village in Rakovník District in the Central Bohemian Region of the Czech Republic. It has about 70 inhabitants.

Etymology
The name is derived from the Old Czech personal name Bda, meaning "Bda's court".

Geography
It lies in the geomorphological mesoregion of Džbán. The Bakovský Stream flows through the municipality.

History
The first written mention of Bdín is from 1318.

Sights
Bdín is poor in monuments. The most notable sights are a wooden bellfry and a bust of John Amos Comenius from 1913.

References

External links

Villages in Rakovník District